Anglins Creek is a stream in the U.S. state of West Virginia.

Anglins Creek most likely has the name of an early settler. It is known for whitewater rafting.

See also
List of rivers of West Virginia

References

Rivers of Greenbrier County, West Virginia
Rivers of Nicholas County, West Virginia
Rivers of West Virginia